Marcus Hanikel (born 10 March 1983) is a retired Austrian footballer.

External links
 

1985 births
Living people
Association football forwards
Austrian footballers
SC Untersiebenbrunn players
SV Mattersburg players
FC Admira Wacker Mödling players
SV Grödig players
WSG Tirol players
FC Lustenau players
2. Liga (Austria) players